The 2009 Women's Oceania Cup was the sixth edition of the women's field hockey tournament. It was held from 25 to 29 August in Invercargill.

The tournament served as a qualifier for the 2010 FIH World Cup.

New Zealand won the tournament for the second time, defeating Australia 4–3 in penalties after the final finished as a 2–2 draw.

Teams

Results
All times are local (NZST).

Preliminary round

Pool

Fixtures

Classification

Final

Statistics

Final standings

Goalscorers

References

2009
2009 in women's field hockey
2009 in New Zealand women's sport
2009 Oceania Cup
2009 Oceania Cup
August 2009 sports events in New Zealand
Oceania Cup